The 1991 Mid Suffolk District Council election took place on 2 May 1991 to elect members of Mid Suffolk District Council in England. This was on the same day as other local elections.

Summary

|}

References

1991 English local elections
May 1991 events in the United Kingdom
1991